The Annex SL (also known as Annex L in the 2019th edition) is a section of the ISO/IEC Directives part 1 that prescribes how ISO Management System Standard (MSS) standards should be written. The aim of Annex SL is to enhance the consistency and alignment of MSS by providing a unifying and agreed-upon high level structure, identical core text and common terms and core definitions. The aim being that all ISO Type A MSS (and B where appropriate) are aligned and the compatibility of these standards is enhanced.

Before 2012, various standards for management systems were written in different ways. Several attempts have been made since the late 90s to harmonize the way to write these but the first group that succeeded to reach an agreement was the Joint Technical Coordination Group (JTCG) set up by ISO/Technical Management Board.

Various of Technical Committees within ISO are currently working on revising all MSS published before Annex SL was adopted. Many standards are already following Annex SL such as ISO 9001, and ISO 14001.

High level structure
According to Annex SL, a Management System Standard should follow the structure:
 Scope
 Normative references
 Terms and definitions
 Context of the organisation
 Leadership
 Planning
 Support
 Operation
 Performance evaluation
 Improvement

Types of standards
Two kinds of standards for management systems are defined by the Annex SL:
 Type A MSS: in regard to management system requirement (for example ISO 9001 and ISO 14001)
 Type B MSS: in regard to guidelines (for instance ISO 9004 and ISO 14004)

MSS (Type A) following Annex SL 
 ISO 9001:2015, Quality management systems - Requirements
 ISO 14001:2015, Environmental management systems - Requirements with guidance for use
 ISO 14298:2013, Graphic technology - Management of security printing processes
 ISO 18788:2015, Management system for private security operations - Requirements with guidance for use
 ISO/IEC 19770-1:2017, Information technology - IT asset management - Part 1: IT asset management systems - Requirements
 ISO/IEC 20000-1:2018, Information technology - Service management - Part 1: Service management system requirements
 ISO 20121:2012, Event sustainability management systems - Requirements with guidance for use
 ISO 21001:2018, Educational organizations - Management systems for educational organizations - Requirements with guidance for use
 ISO 21101:2014, Adventure tourism - Safety management systems - Requirements
 ISO 21401:2018, Tourism and related services - Sustainability management system for accommodation establishments – Requirements
 ISO 22000:2018, Food safety management systems - Requirements for any organization in the food chain
 ISO 22301:2019, Security and resilience - Business continuity management systems - Requirements
 ISO/IEC 27001:2013, Information technology - Security techniques - Information security management systems - Requirements
 ISO 28000:2022, Security and resilience - Business continuity management systems - Requirements
 ISO 30301:2019, Information and documentation - Management systems for records - Requirements
 ISO 30401:2018, Knowledge management systems – Requirements
 ISO 35001:2019, Biorisk management for laboratories and other related organisations
 ISO 34101-1:2019, Sustainable and traceable cocoa beans - Part 1: Requirements for sustainability management systems
 ISO 37001:2016, Anti-bribery management systems - Requirements with guidance for use
 ISO 37101:2016, Sustainable development in communities - Management system for sustainable development - Requirements with guidance for use
 ISO 37301:2021, Compliance management systems - Requirements with guidance for use
 ISO 39001:2012, Road traffic safety (RTS) management systems - Requirements with guidance for use
 ISO 41001:2018, Facility management - Management systems - Requirements with guidance for use
 ISO 44001:2017, Collaborative business relationship management systems - Requirements and framework
 ISO 45001:2018, Occupational health and safety management systems - Requirements with guidance for use
 ISO 46001:2019, Water efficiency management systems - Requirements with guidance for use
 ISO 50001:2018, Energy management systems - Requirements with guidance for use 
 ISO 55001:2014, Asset management - Management systems - Requirements
Sector specific to ISO 9001
 ISO 15378:2017, Primary packaging materials for medicinal products — Particular requirements for the application of ISO 9001:2015, with reference to good manufacturing practice (GMP)
 ISO 19443:2018, Quality management systems — Specific requirements for the application of ISO 9001:2015 by organizations in the supply chain of the nuclear energy sector supplying products and services important to nuclear safety (ITNS)
 ISO/TS 22163:2017, Railway applications — Quality management system — Business management system requirements for rail organizations: ISO 9001:2015 and particular requirements for application in the rail sector
 ISO/TS 54001:2019, Quality management systems — Particular requirements for the application of ISO 9001:2015 for electoral organizations at all levels of government 
 ISO/IEC 80079-34:2018, Explosive atmospheres — Part 34: Application of quality systems for ex product manufacture

MSS (Type A) not yet revised in accordance with Annex SL 
 ISO 10012:2003, Measurement management systems - Requirements for measurement processes and measuring equipment
 ISO 30000:2009, Ships and marine technology - Ship recycling management systems - Specifications for management systems for safe and environmentally sound ship recycling facilities

Sector specific to ISO 9001
 ISO 13485:2016, Medical devices - Quality management systems - Requirements for regulatory purposes
 ISO 16000-40:2019, Indoor air - Part 40: Indoor Air Quality Management System
 ISO/TS 17582:2014, Quality management systems - Particular requirements for the application of ISO 9001:2008 for electoral organizations at all levels of government
 ISO/TS 29001:2010 Petroleum, petrochemical and natural gas industries - Sector-specific quality management systems - Requirements for product and service supply organizations

Sector specific to ISO/IEC 27001
 ISO/IEC 27701:2019, Information technology - Security techniques - Enhancement to ISO/IEC 27001 for privacy management - Requirements

MSS (Type A) under development

ISO 7101 Healthcare Quality Management Systems Standard

MSS (Type B) following Annex SL 

 ISO/TS 9002:2016, Quality management systems - Guidelines for the application of ISO 9001:2015
 ISO 9004:2018, Quality management — Quality of an organization — Guidance to achieve sustained success
 ISO 14004:2016, Environmental management systems — General guidelines on implementation
 ISO 18091:2019, Quality management - Guidelines for the application of ISO 9001:2008 in local government
 ISO 19600:2014, Compliance management systems — Guidelines
 ISO 22313:2020, Security and resilience — Business continuity management systems — Guidance on the use of ISO 22301
 ISO 24518:2015, Activities relating to drinking water and wastewater services — Crisis management of water utilities
 ISO 50004:2020, Energy management systems — Guidance for the implementation, maintenance and improvement of an energy management system
 ISO 55002:2018, Asset management — Management systems — Guidelines for the application of ISO 55001
 ISO 56002:2019, Innovation management - Innovation management system - Guidance
 ISO/IEC/IEEE 90003:2018, Software engineering — Guidelines for the application of ISO 9001:2015 to computer software

MSS (Type B) not following Annex SL 
 ISO 14002-1:2019, Environmental management systems - Guidelines for applying the ISO 14001 framework to environmental aspects and environmental conditions by environmental topic areas - Part 1: General
 ISO 14005:2019, Environmental management systems — Guidelines for a flexible approach to phased implementation
 ISO 22004:2014, Food safety management systems — Guidance on the application of ISO 22000
 ISO/IEC 27013:2015, Information technology — Security techniques — Guidance on the integrated implementation of ISO/IEC 27001 and ISO/IEC 20000-1 (under revision)
 ISO 28001:2007, Security management systems for the supply chain — Best practices for implementing supply chain security, assessments and plans - Requirements and guidance
 ISO 28002:2011, Security management systems for the supply chain — Development of resilience in the supply chain — Requirements with guidance for use
 ISO 28007-1:2015, Ships and marine technology — Guidelines for Private Maritime Security Companies (PMSC) providing privately contracted armed security personnel (PCASP) on board ships (and pro forma contract) - Part 1: General

MSS (Type B) under development 
 ISO 37002, Whistleblowing management systems - Guidelines

See also 
Wikipedia List of ISO standards

References

External links
ISO Management System Standards

ISO standards